Hing Tung Estate is a public housing estate in Sai Wan Ho, Hong Kong Island, Hong Kong. The estate was constructed in a former squatter areas at a hill in Southwest Shau Kei Wan and consists of 3 residential buildings built in 1996.

Tung Hei Court, Tung Lam Court and Tung Yan Court are Home Ownership Scheme housing courts in a former squatter areas at a hill in Southwest Shau Kei Wan, near Hing Tung Estate, built between 1995 and 1998.

Houses

Hing Tung Estate

Tung Hei Court

Tung Lam Court

Tung Yan Court

Demographics
According to the 2016 by-census, Hing Tung Estate had a population of 6,296 while Tung Hei Court had a population of 7,157. Altogether the population amounts to 13,453.

Politics
Hing Tung Estate, Tung Hei Court, Tung Lam Court and Tung Yan Court are located in Hing Tung constituency of the Eastern District Council. It is currently represented by Cheung Chun-kit, who was elected in the 2019 elections.

Education
Hing Tung Estate, Tung Hei Court, and Tung Lam Court are in Primary One Admission (POA) School Net 16. Within the school net are multiple aided schools (operated independently but funded with government money) and two government schools: Shau Kei Wan Government Primary School and Aldrich Bay Government Primary School.

See also

Public housing estates in Shau Kei Wan

References

Residential buildings completed in 1996
Residential buildings completed in 1997
Shau Kei Wan
Sai Wan Ho
Public housing estates in Hong Kong